KL, kL, kl, or kl. may refer to:

Businesses and organizations
 KLM, a Dutch airline (IATA airline designator KL)
 Koninklijke Landmacht, the Royal Netherlands Army
 Kvenna Listin ("Women's List"), a political party in Iceland
 KL FM, a Malay language radio station

Places
 Kaiserslautern, Germany (license plate code KL)
 Kerala, India (ISO 3166-2:IN subcode KL)
 Kirkland Lake, Ontario, Canada
 Kowloon, Hong Kong
 Kuala Lumpur, Malaysia

Science, technology, and mathematics
 KL engine, version of the Mazda K engine
 Klepton (kl.), a type of species in zoology
 Kiloliter (kL), a unit of volume
 Kullback–Leibler divergence in mathematics
 KL (gene), a gene which encodes the klotho enzyme in humans

Other uses
 Jeep Cherokee (KL)
 Kalaallisut language (ISO 639 alpha-2 language code "kl")
 Kl (digraph), used in the Zulu language to write /kʟ̥ʼ/ or /kxʼ/
 Konzentrationslager, or concentration camp, abbreviated KZ or KL
 KL – A History of the Nazi Concentration Camps, a book by Nikolaus Wachsmann

See also
 KL Gangster, a 2011 Malaysian action film